People is the plural of "person" and may also refer to:
 A people, a coherent social group or ethnic group.

Books and publications
People (play), a play by Alan Bennett
 People (magazine), an American celebrity news magazine
 People (Australian magazine), an Australian men's magazine

Film and TV
People (TV series), a 1955 Canadian television series
People (film), a 2004 French comedy film

Music
 People Records, a record label founded by James Brown
 People!, a 1960s rock band including Larry Norman

Albums
 People (Barbra Streisand album), released in 1964
 People (James Brown album), 1980
 People (Johnny Mathis album), a 1969 compilation album
 People (Howard Jones album), released in 1998
 People (Hothouse Flowers album), a 1988 Celtic rock album
 People (Hillsong United album), released in 2019
 People (Animal Collective EP), a 2006 work
 People (The Golden Republic EP), a 2004 recording by the American rock band The Golden Republic
 People (Code Kunst album), a 2020 work

Songs
 "People" (Barbra Streisand song), sometimes known as "People Who Need People", from the Broadway musical Funny Girl 
 "People" (Mi-Sex song), a 1980 single by band Mi-Sex
 "People" (King Crimson song), a 1995 single by the band King Crimson
 "People" (The 1975 song), a 2019 single by the band The 1975
 "People", a song by Level 42 on the album Standing in the Light
 "People", a song by Andrew Jackson Jihad on the 2007 album People That Can Eat People Are the Luckiest People in the World
 "People II: The Reckoning", a song by Andrew Jackson Jihad on the 2007 album People That Can Eat People Are the Luckiest People in the World
 "People II 2: Still Peoplin'", a song by Andrew Jackson Jihad on the 2011 album Knife Man
 "People", a 2008 song by thenewno2 from You Are Here
 "People," a 2005 B-side from the virtual band Gorillaz single "Dare" (song)
 "People,", a song by Fat Mattress on the 1970 album Fat Mattress II
 "People", a song by Agust D from D-2, 2020

Businesses and organisations
Peoples (airline)
 Peoples, former name of China Mobile Hong Kong (CMHK)
Peoples (store), a defunct department store chain in Tacoma, Washington
Peoples II, the jewelry store chain in Canada
Peoples Drug, a chain of drug stores based in Alexandria, Virginia
 People, the original name of the Green Party (UK)

Persons
Ann Peoples (1947-2019), American politician
Ann Peoples (Antarctic manager), American anthropologist
David Peoples (born 1940), American screenwriter
Dorothy "Dottie" Peoples (born 1950), American gospel singer
Michael Peoples (born 1991), American professional baseball player

Other

 Outlook People on Outlook.com, formerly named People, a consumer web-based address book service
 People (Windows), an address book application integrated into certain versions of Microsoft Windows
 In several US states, The People is the prosecuting party in criminal offenses.

See also
People skills, ability to communicate effectively with people in a friendly way, especially in business
 Person (disambiguation)
 The People (disambiguation)
 Popular (disambiguation)
 Folk (disambiguation)
 Humans